The 1968 Iowa Hawkeyes football team represented the University of Iowa in the 1968 Big Ten Conference football season. Led by third-year head coach Ray Nagel, the Hawkeyes compiled an overall record of 5–5 with a mark of 4–3 in conference play, tying for fifth place in the Big Ten. The team played home games at Iowa Stadium in Iowa City, Iowa.

Schedule

Roster

Game summaries

Oregon State

at TCU

Notre Dame

at Purdue

Northwestern

It was a record-setting day for the Hawkeyes. Iowa established a Big Ten record for total offense with 639 yards (431 rushing). Ed Podolak rushed for 286 yards (setting Iowa and Big Ten records) and two touchdowns on 17 carries. His performance still ranks #2 on Iowa's single-game rushing list.

Ohio State

at Illinois

After winning only 4 games combined over the previous three seasons, the Hawkeyes earned their 5th victory of the season.

References

Iowa
Iowa Hawkeyes football seasons
Iowa Hawkeyes football